Dexter Manley Bussey (born March 11, 1952) is a former American football running back. He played professional football in the National Football League (NFL) for the Detroit Lions for 11 years from 1974 to 1984 and became the Lions' all-time career rushing leader in 1981.

Bussey was born in Dallas, Texas, in 1952.  He began his college career at the University of Oklahoma, but he transferred to the University of Texas–Arlington.  He played for the Texas–Arlington Mavericks football team from 1971 to 1973 and totaled over 1,000 yards from scrimmage in both 1972 and 1973.

Bussey was selected by the Detroit Lions in the third round, 65th overall pick, of the 1974 NFL Draft. He played for the Lions from 1974 to 1984.  While with the Lions, he gained more than 1,000 yards from scrimmage in 1976, 1978, and 1980.  In his 10-year career in the NFL, Bussey totaled 5,105 rushing yards and 6,721 yards from scrimmage. He was the Lions' starting halfback from 1975 to 1979 and the team's leading rusher in 1975, 1976, 1978, and 1979.  He moved to fullback in 1980 after the Lions drafted Billy Sims.  Bussey broke Altie Taylor's Lions' career rushing record in 1981, but his record was surpassed by Sims in 1984 and he became a backup after the Lions drafted James Jones in 1983. Bussey announced his retirement from the NFL in April 1985 at age 33.

After retiring as a player, Bussey worked for at least 20 years as a uniform inspector for the NFL.  He also operated a medical staffing agency.

References

1952 births
Living people
American football running backs
Texas–Arlington Mavericks football players
Detroit Lions players
Oklahoma Sooners football players